The Welwyn Tunnel rail crash took place in Welwyn North Tunnel, north of Welwyn (now Welwyn North) station on the Great Northern Railway, on 9 June 1866.  According to L T C Rolt, "from the point of view of damage to engines and rolling stock it was one of the most destructive in railway history."

Background
There are two tunnels between Welwyn station and Knebworth on the East Coast Main Line, known as Welwyn South Tunnel and Welwyn North Tunnel.  In 1866, traffic through the tunnels was operated using a form of block working - the signalmen at Welwyn and Knebworth communicated with each other via a telegraph system, and were not permitted to signal a train into the tunnels until they had received confirmation that the previous train had cleared the section.  The instrument was a "speaking" telegraph, which was used for general communication between the signal boxes.

Trains involved
The first train involved in the accident consisted of 38 empty coal wagons, hauled by a tender locomotive.  The second train was a Midland Railway goods train from London, with 26 wagons.  The third train was a Great Northern express freight train, carrying meat from Scotland for Smithfield Market.

Sequence of Events
The train of coal empties was signalled away from Welwyn at 23:20.  When passing through the North tunnel, the engine failed and the train came to a stand.  At first, guard Wray recommended that the train be allowed to roll back on the falling gradient to Welwyn, but the driver refused, as such a move would be dangerous and contrary to the rules.
According to regulations, Wray should have placed detonators on the line to protect the rear of his train, but he did not, and he also failed to communicate with either signal box.

At 23:36, the Midland Goods train stopped at Welwyn signal box.  The signalman at Welwyn, who had not received the "out of section" signal for the train of coal empties, sent a telegraph message to Knebworth asking if it had cleared the tunnel. The Knebworth signalman stated to the official enquiry that he had replied with the code for "No", but the Welwyn signalman claimed that he had received a "Yes".  The code for "No" differed from the code for "Out" only by the number of beats on the telegraph needle, and the enquiry ruled that the Welwyn signalman had misinterpreted the signal as being "Out", which would have the same meaning as "Yes" in answer to his question. He therefore cleared his signals and allowed the Midland train into the tunnel.

The Midland train ran into the stationary first train at a speed estimated between 20 and 25 mph. The driver had no warning of its presence, and the collision killed Wray whilst severely injuring Rawlins, an employee of the Metropolitan Railway, who was travelling in the guard's van contrary to the regulations of the Great Northern Railway. He was severely injured and died on the morning of the 12th. The driver and fireman of the Midland train were not seriously injured, but it took them some time to extricate themselves from the debris of the accident.

Before any of the railwaymen could communicate with either signal box, the up meat train was allowed into the tunnel, where it struck the wreckage from the first collision and caught fire.  Due to the difficulty of accessing the tunnel after the accident, and because the fire was directly beneath one of the tunnel's ventilation shafts, it was not extinguished until 11 June - according to Rolt, "all that night and all through the next day the ventilation shaft belched flames, smoke and the smell of roasting meat over the surrounding countryside."

Investigation and consequences
The official report, by Captain F. H. Rich of the Royal Engineers, blamed the collision mainly on Guard Wray of the first train, for failing to protect the rear of his train after it had stopped, and for relying on the signals for protection in this situation.  A secondary cause was the misreading of the telegraph message by the Welwyn signalman.  Rich recommended two changes to the signalling method, which were subsequently adopted in the system of absolute block working - before a train is allowed into a section, the signalman must positively request clearance from the next box ahead, rather than relying on the "out of section" message for the previous train, and a separate block telegraph that permanently displays the state of the section should be used, in addition to the general-purpose "speaking" telegraph.

Similar accidents
 Clayton Tunnel rail crash (1861)
 Norton Fitzwarren rail crash (1890)
 Winwick rail crash (1934)

See also
 List of rail accidents in the United Kingdom

References

Railway accidents and incidents in Hertfordshire
1866 in England
Accidents and incidents involving Great Northern Railway (Great Britain)
19th century in Hertfordshire
Railway accidents in 1866
June 1866 events
Train collisions in England
Railway accidents caused by signaller's error
Train and rapid transit fires
Welwyn
1866 disasters in the United Kingdom